"How Do I Make You Love Me?" is a song by Canadian singer the Weeknd, from his fifth studio album Dawn FM (2022). It was written by the Weeknd, OPN, Max Martin, Swedish House Mafia, Oscar Holter and Matt Cohn. The song was produced by the Weeknd and Oneohtrix Point Never, and co-produced by Martin, Swedish House Mafia, Holter and Cohn. It was met with positive reviews, and entered various charts around the world, peaking at number 16 in Canada, number 22 in the United Kingdom and number 39 in the United States.

On July 22, 2022, the Weeknd released an animated music video for "How Do I Make You Love Me?". On the same day, he released a remix created by Sebastian Ingrosso and Salvatore Ganacci. The Weeknd performed the song during his After Hours til Dawn Tour and included it on his 2023 live album, Live at SoFi Stadium.

Background and promotion
The song's name was first revealed on January 5, 2022, when the Weeknd posted the track listing for his Dawn FM album.

On January 7, 2022, alongside the release of Dawn FM, the Weeknd hosted a live event with Amazon Music, in which he served as a disc jockey and played the entire album, including "How Do I Make You Love Me?", in front of a small crowd. Various different shots of the livestream were turned into lyric videos for the album.

On February 21, 2022, the Weeknd announced The Dawn FM Experience, a television music special with Amazon Prime Video that premiered on February 26. The special featured selected songs from Dawn FM, including "How Do I Make You Love Me?". A ten-track live EP composed of the songs the Weeknd performed during the special was made available to stream exclusively on Amazon Music.

On October 18, 2021, the Weeknd announced that his upcoming seventh concert tour will incorporate elements from Dawn FM. "How Do I Make You Love Me?" became one of the songs performed during After Hours til Dawn Tour and later included on Live at SoFi Stadium album (2023).

Music video
An animated music video for "How Do I Make You Love Me?" was released on July 22, 2022. It was directed by Jocelyn Charles with some creative direction from Cliqua.

Charts

References

External links
 
 
 

2022 songs
Canadian synth-pop songs
Songs written by the Weeknd
The Weeknd songs
Song recordings produced by the Weeknd
Song recordings produced by Max Martin
Republic Records singles